Bumhpa Bum is one of the highest mountains in Myanmar and is located in the Kachin Hills.

See also
Kachin Hills
List of mountains in Burma
List of Ultras of Southeast Asia

References

External links
The History of Burma's Jade Mines
Google Books, The Physical Geography of Southeast Asia

Geography of Kachin State
Mountains of Myanmar